The Bulletin of Volcanology is a peer reviewed scientific journal that is published ten times per year by  Springer Science+Business Media. It is the official journal of the International Association of Volcanology and Chemistry of the Earth's Interior (IAVCEI). The focus of the journal is volcanoes, volcanic products, eruptive behavior, and volcanic hazards. The Executive Editor is James DL White.

The impact factor for Bulletin of Volcanology in 2020 is 2.517.

Scope and history

Applying geochemical, petrological, and geophysical techniques to understand volcanic systems (magmatic systems) and their evolution is part of this journal's focus. Publishing formats include original research papers, reviews, communications, and a discussion forum. Additionally, this journal is a continuation of Bulletin Volcanologique which was published first in 1922. 
In 1986 Springer-Verlag started publishing this journal with Volume 48.

Abstracting and indexing
Bulletin of Volcanology is indexed in the following databases:
 Academic OneFile
 Academic Search
 Astrophysics Data System (ADS)
 Current Abstracts
 Current Contents/Physical, Chemical and Earth Sciences
 EBSCO
 Gale
 GEOBASE
 GeoRef
 INIS Atomindex
 Journal Citation Reports
 PASCAL
 Science Citation Index
 SciSearch
 SCOPUS
 Summon by Serial Solutions
 VINITI

References

External links
 
 International Association of Volcanology and Chemistry of the Earth's Interior
 Bulletin of Volcanology at IAVCEI
 Bulletin volcanologique. Napoli : F. Giannini 1924-1984.

English-language journals
Geology journals
Springer Science+Business Media academic journals
Publications established in 1922
Bimonthly journals
Volcanology